Timiryazevsky District  is an administrative district (raion) of Northern Administrative Okrug, and one of the 125 raions of Moscow, Russia. The district is known for its public parks - Timiryazavsky Park and the Dubki Park - and the Timiryazev Agricultural Academy. Population: 82,800 (2017 est.)

History
Timiryazavsky Park is near the site of the Petrovsko-Razumovskoye estate.  The estate was the ancestral home of the Shuysky family, sold to the Naryshkin family in 1676 and passed to Peter the Great in 1705 and became known as 'Petrovsky'.  It was owned by the Razumovsky Family in the 18th and 19th centuries.  On the grounds was built the Razumovsky Palace, the architect of which was Nicholas Benois.  1n 1861, the palace became the home of the Petrovsky Agricultural and Forestry Academy, today the Timiryazev Agricultural Academy.

The academy, and the district, are named for Kliment Timiryazev, a botanist who established a faculty and laboratory of vegetable physiology at the Petrovsky Academy.  The academy houses several museums open to the public, including what the district government calls 'the only horse-breeding museum in the world'.

See also
Administrative divisions of Moscow

References

Notes

Sources

External links
 [Timiryazevsky Public Park http://www.moscow.info/parks/timiryazevsky-park.aspx]

Districts of Moscow
Northern Administrative Okrug